Rotan is a city in Fisher County, Texas, United States. The population was 1,508 at the 2010 census, down from 1,611 at the 2000 census.

Geography
Texas State Highway 92 leads east from Rotan  to Hamlin.

According to the United States Census Bureau, Rotan has a total area of 2.0 mi2 (5.2 km2), all of it land.

Climate
Rotan's climate type occurs primarily on the periphery of the true deserts in low-latitude semiarid steppe regions.  The Köppen climate classification subtype for this climate is BSh (tropical and subtropical steppe climate).

<div style="width:65%">

</div style>

Demographics

2020 census

As of the 2020 United States census, there were 1,332 people, 594 households, and 364 families residing in the city.

2000 census
As of the census of 2000,  1,611 people, 665 households, and 442 families resided in the city. The population density was 791.3 people per square mile (304.9/km). The 841 housing units averaged 413.1 per square mile (159.2/km). The racial makeup of the city was 72.44% White, 5.59% African American, 0.25% Native American, 0.19% Asian, 19.49% from other races, and 2.05% from two or more races. Hispanics or Latinos of any race were 32.90% of the population.

Of the 665 households, 28.0% had children under the age of 18 living with them, 51.6% were married couples living together, 11.9% had a female householder with no husband present, and 33.5% were not families; 32.3% of all households were made up of individuals, and 21.4% had someone living alone who was 65 years of age or older. The average household size was 2.35 and the average family size was 2.95.

In the city, the population was distributed as 24.6% under the age of 18, 8.0% from 18 to 24, 22.2% from 25 to 44, 21.7% from 45 to 64, and 23.5% who were 65 years of age or older. The median age was 41 years. For every 100 females, there were 87.3 males. For every 100 females age 18 and over, there were 82.2 males.

The median income for a household in the city was $21,638, and for a family was $29,038. Males had a median income of $25,688 versus $17,045 for females. The per capita income for the city was $13,097. About 16.6% of families and 22.6% of the population were below the poverty line, including 39.0% of those under age 18 and 11.9% of those age 65 or over.

Education
The city is served by the Rotan Independent School District.

Notable people

 Sammy Baugh, quarterback for the Washington Redskins, had a ranch in Rotan. He lived there many years and died there on December 17, 2008, at the age of 94
 Ella Hudson Day, composer, was one of the first to live here

References

Cities in Fisher County, Texas
Cities in Texas